IWA Hardcore Championship was a title contested under Hardcore wrestling rules (with the application of the 24/7 rules) in the International Wrestling Association in Puerto Rico. On October 4, 2008, the title was unified with the IWA Puerto Rico Heavyweight Championship.

Title history (2000–2008, 2012)
The first IWA Hardcore Champion was crowned on a 20 Minute Limit Hardcore Match and wrestlers that took part of it were: Huracán Castillo Jr., Pain, Miguel Pérez Jr., Ninjitzu, Ricky Banderas, Apolo, TNT (Hombre Dinamita), Super Crazy, Tajiri, Chicky Starr, Victor the Bodyguard, Vyzago (Brett Sanders), Andy Anderson, Taka Michinoku, Andrés Borges and Sean Hill

Combined reigns

References

External links
Wrestling-titles.com

International Wrestling Association (Puerto Rico) championships
Hardcore wrestling championships